Thompson Estate and Eastern Suburbs Athletics is oldest sporting club in Brisbane, Queensland, Australia, founded in 1900.  Run by volunteers, it caters for athletes and cross country runners of all abilities.

Notable athletes who developed at Thompson Estate and Eastern Suburbs Athletics include Jai Taurima,  Bronwyn Thompson, Denise Boyd and Gerrard Gosens.

References

Further reading 

 

Sport in Brisbane
Athletics clubs in Australia
1900 establishments in Australia
Sports clubs established in 1900